9 Monkeys of Shaolin is a side-scrolling beat 'em up developed by Russian independent game studio Sobaka Studio and published by Ravenscourt and Buka Entertainment with Teyon in Japan and Sonkwo in China. 

The story recreates the atmosphere of the kung fu movies of the 70s. In 9 Monkeys of Shaolin, a fisherman goes to become one of the masters of Shaolin. On this way he passes life trials, meets new people with their unique personalities, and learns about revenge and death. Some of the people he met become his friends, and some betray him. But despite all of the difficulties on the difficult path, he has chosen to strive to leave his mark on history by saving his homeland and the whole world from evil.

Although the game world tries to adhere to real historical events, places, weapons and characters as much as possible, it also has magic, supernatural beings and other fantasy elements. This setting is the combination of real history with mysticism and fables, as it is customary in the Chinese fantasy genre of Wuxia.

Gameplay
There are five enemy clans in the in Wokou in the game, one for each chapter. Each clan leader wears a mask from the Japanese Noh theatre, which reflects their personality. The leaders' names are pseudonyms taken from the mask names.

At the end of each mission, the player gets improvement points that can be spent in the camp of the teaching monk. A conversation with him will bring up a single branched technique tree, in which the main improvement subject are different combinations and techniques for each of the three stands.

Multiplayer is available as a co-op mode of the same story campaign as in single-player mode. Two players can participate in the co-op mode, either online or on a local area network.

Plot
China, Year of the Water Monkey (1572). The hero of the game is a fisherman called Wei Cheng (voiced by Daisuke Tsuji). His parents died at the hands of the Wokou when he was a child. Wei Cheng was taken in by his grandfather, who taught him the fishing business, as well as how to fight with a staff, with this knowledge being passed down from generation to generation in their family. 

The game begins when the village is attacked by bandits. Grandfather was killed and Wei was badly wounded by their leader in a red mask. Buddhist monks find Wei Cheng bleeding and carry him to one of the local fortified houses. The hero regains consciousness and finds monks standing in front of him. They say that the village has been completely destroyed, there are almost no survivors, and that there were no ordinary bandits but the Wokou. Their group was sent from Shaolin to help defend both the Buddhist monasteries and the ordinary people but they did not get there in time. Wei Cheng offers to help seven monks and one smuggler. 

In cooperation mode the second player is the youngest of monks called Daoshan.

Development
9 Monkeys of Shaolin was announced at Game Developers Conference 2018 via the ID@Xbox Program. A new demonstration version was shown at Gamescom 2018 in Indie Arena Booth area and at IgroMir 2018. The game received the Critics' Choice award at Indie Cup Summer 2018 and Grand Prize, Best Desktop, Excellence in Game Design, Visual Art, Audio nominations at DevGAMM Awards. The game was released on October 16, 2020.

Reception

9 Monkeys of Shaolin received "generally favorable" reviews, according to review aggregator Metacritic.

References

Video games developed in Russia
2020 video games
Linux games
MacOS games
Beat 'em ups
Hack and slash games
Nintendo Switch games
PlayStation 4 games
PlayStation Network games
Windows games
Wuxia video games
Xbox One games
Side-scrolling beat 'em ups
Cooperative video games
Video games set in China
Unreal Engine games
Video games set in the 16th century
Buka Entertainment games
Multiplayer and single-player video games
Teyon games